The New England Governors and Eastern Canadian Premiers' Annual Conference is an annual international meeting of the American governors of the six New England states of Connecticut, Maine, Massachusetts, New Hampshire, Rhode Island, and Vermont as well as the Canadian premiers of Quebec, Nova Scotia, New Brunswick, Prince Edward Island and Newfoundland and Labrador. According to the Council of Atlantic Premiers, the meeting is meant to "advance the interests" of the states and provinces as well as to encourage "cooperation" built on the "historic ties" between them The first conference was held in 1973. In 2014, the 38th annual conference was held at Bretton Woods in northern New Hampshire.

Climate Change Initiative

The Premiers and governors agreed to reduce their greenhouse gas emissions multiple times during the conferences over the years. The targets are 1990 levels by 2010, at least 10% below 1990 levels by 2020, 35-45% below 1990 levels by 2030, and a 75-85% reduction of 2001 levels by 2050.

The province of Nova Scotia met the 2020 objective six years in advance.

See also
Atlantic Northeast

References 

Canada–United States relations
Political conferences
Recurring events established in 1973
Paradiplomacy
1973 establishments in North America